Solveig Schytz (born 19 February 1976) is a Norwegian politician for the Liberal Party.

She served as a deputy representative to the Parliament of Norway from Akershus during the terms 2013–2017 and 2017–2021. When Abid Raja took a cabinet seat in 2020, Schytz became a regular member of Parliament.

Hailing from Molde, she has been an elected member of Ås municipal council and Akershus county council.
In 2021, Solveig Schytz has proposed the World Organization of the Scout Movement (WOSM) and the World Association of Girl Guides and Girl Scouts (WAGGGS) for the Nobel Peace Prize. Solveig Schytz is a Scout movement volunteer.

References

1976 births
Living people
People from Molde
People from Ås, Akershus
Akershus politicians
Members of the Storting
Liberal Party (Norway) politicians
21st-century Norwegian politicians
21st-century Norwegian women politicians
Women members of the Storting